Tessa Mary Isabel Balfour, Countess of Balfour (née Fitzalan-Howard; born 30 September 1950), is a British aristocrat.

Biography
Balfour was born on 30 September 1950 to Miles Fitzalan-Howard and his wife, the former Anne Constable-Maxwell. In 1971, her father inherited the title of Baron Beaumont from his mother, and the next year inherited the title of Baron Howard of Glossop from his father. This entitled her and her younger siblings to the style "The Honourable". In 1975, her father further inherited the Dukedom of Norfolk from his second cousin once removed, the 16th Duke of Norfolk.

On 14 July 1971, Balfour married Roderick Balfour. They have four children:
 Lady Willa Anne Balfour (born 1973); married George William Franks in 1997.
 Arthur Anthony Franks (born 1999)
 Violet Miriam Franks (born 2000)
 Esmé Alice Franks (born 2004)
 Lady Kinvara Clare Rachel Balfour (born 1975); married to Count Riccardo Lanza from 2009 to 2011.
 Marlowe Balfour Shahani (born 2018)
 Lady Maria Alice Jubilee Balfour (born 1977); married Charles Wigan in 2006.
 Aliena Mirabelle Wigan (born 2009)
 Caius Christian Wigan (born 2013)
 Lady Candida Rose Balfour (born 1984)

On 27 June 2003, Balfour's husband succeeded his second cousin once removed Gerald as the Earl of Balfour. She thus became Countess of Balfour and Viscountess Traprain.

References

1950 births
Living people
British countesses
Daughters of British dukes